Division Street is a major east-west street in Chicago, Illinois, located at 1200 North (one and a half miles north of Madison Street). Division Street begins in the Gold Coast neighborhood near Lake Shore Drive, passes through Polonia Triangle  at Milwaukee Avenue into Wicker Park and continues to Chicago's city limits and into the city's western suburbs. Once known as "Polish Broadway" during the heyday of Polish Downtown,<ref>Coorens, Elaine A: Wicker Park From 1676 Thru 1929 and Walking Tour Guide, Old Wicker Park Committee, 2003 p. 25</ref> Division Street was the favorite street of author Nelson Algren. A fountain dedicated in his name was installed in what had been the area that figured as the inspiration for much of his work.

Division Street once served as one of Chicago's main and hippest club strips, with bars and clubs lining much of the street from State Street west to Dearborn Street.  Today, the street serves as the Near North Side's second major nightlife hub, second only to the upscale River North entertainment district, located north and east of the Chicago River, and west of the famed Michigan Avenue shopping district and south of Chicago Avenue, focusing on Hubbard Street as the epicenter. The Division Street bars and clubs stay open very late, with most closing 4 o'clock or 5 o'clock in the morning. The street is usually very crowded and busy, and after 3 AM, Chicago police usually block off the street to vehicular traffic due to the heavy pedestrian presence. Further to the west, Division serves areas of the city that are not as economically vibrant, including for many years the Cabrini-Green public housing development, continuing a pattern of social class division noted by author Studs Terkel in his book, Division Street: America. Division Street has a Red Line stop at Clark/Division. Division Street is also served by the Division/Milwaukee stop on the Blue Line at Polonia Triangle.

On the north side of this street, two doors to the east of Dearborn Street, is the bar called "Mother's" which gained some prominence as a result of the 1986 film, About Last Night.... The film was based on the 1974 play, Sexual Perversity in Chicago, by David Mamet, which was set in the subculture to be found in the intersecting Rush Street and Division Street bars, at the time.  It focused on a group of characters who frequented the bar in question, portraying the corrosive effects of the subculture on relations within

The exterior shots were of the real bar, though the interior shots were done elsewhere. Mother's is located in a basement, with many support pillars through its unusually-shaped space, due to the proximity of the tunnel for the Red Line train and its air intake shafts.

Farther west, around Damen Avenue (2000 W), are a number of upscale restaurants, shops, and bars.  This is one of the trendiest strips in the city.  These are popular in the gentrifying neighborhoods of Wicker Park, East Village, Ukrainian Village and Pulaski Park. This neighborhood figured prominently in the 1977 film, Looking for Mr. Goodbar.Paseo Boricua (loosely translated as "Boricua Promenade") is located further west along Division Street between Western Avenue and California Avenue, in the neighborhood of Humboldt Park. The strip is flanked on both sides by  Puerto Rican flags made of steel. Dedicated to Puerto Rican pride, this part of the street includes a "walk of fame", with the names of many outstanding Puerto Ricans.  Paseo Boricua'' is the political and cultural capital of the Puerto Rican community in the Midwest and, some say, in the Puerto Rican Diaspora.

The Horween Leather Company, founded as I. Horween and Co. in 1905, was originally located on Division Street. The company moved in 1927 to North Elston Avenue.

Transportation
Division Street is primarily served by the 70 Division bus of the CTA between Dearborn Street and Austin Avenue.

The Red Line and Blue Line also have a station at Clark Street and Milwaukee Avenue respectively.

Major intersections

See also
Division Street Russian and Turkish Baths

References

External links
New York Times: On the Old 'Polish Broadway,' Boutiques and Spas Arrive
David Mamet Society – Sexual Perversity in Chicago

Polish-American culture in Chicago
Puerto Rican culture in Chicago
Streets in Chicago